

The Kalmyk people are the only people of Europe whose national religion is Buddhism. In 2016, 53.4% of the population surveyed identified themselves as Buddhist. They live in Kalmykia,  a federal subject of the Russian Federation located in southwestern Russia. The border faces Dagestan to the south, Stavropol Krai to the southwest, Rostov Oblast to the west, Volgograd Oblast to the northwest and Astrakhan Oblast to the east. The Caspian Sea borders Kalmykia to the southeast.

The Kalmyks are the descendants of Oirats who migrated to Europe during the early part of the 17th century.  As Tibetan Buddhists, the Kalmyks regard the Dalai Lama as their spiritual leader. The Šajin Lama (Supreme Lama) of the Kalmyks is Erdne Ombadykow, a Philadelphia-born man of Kalmykian origin who was brought up as a Buddhist monk in a Tibetan monastery in India from the age of seven. Ombadykow was appointed to this position by the 14th Dalai Lama in 1992, who identified him as the reincarnation of the Buddhist saint Telo Rinpoche. Ombdaykow divides his time between living in Colorado and living in Kalmykia.

Kalmyk political refugees opened the first Buddhist temple in Central Europe, the Belgrade pagoda, located in Belgrade, Serbia, in 1929. In the wake of the Second World War, an estimated 526 Kalmyk refugees migrated from West Germany and surrounding areas to America in the late 1951 and early 1952. By 1962, the approximate Kalmyk population in the United States was 700. There, they established several Kalmyk Buddhist temples in Monmouth County, New Jersey and its environs. Ngawang Wangyal, a Kalmyk Buddhist monk, established the Tibetan Buddhist Learning Center and monastery in Washington, New Jersey.

The babushki matsik 

The babushki matsik, meaning "group of old women precept holders" were groups of elderly women who perpetuated traditional Tibetan Buddhist practices during the forced deportation of Kalmyk nationals to Siberia in 1943. This followed a period in the 1930s of the arrests and persecution of the Buddhist clergy under the Stalinist regime. During this period, all Kalmyk Buddhist shrines and temples were demolished. The babushki matsik are increasingly recognised for their role in preserving translated Tibetan Buddhist sacred texts, advantageously using their "politically negligible" status as old women to create untouchable religious material that could then be recorded and dispersed in periods of religious freedom.

See also
 Buddhism in Buryatia
 Buddhism in Russia
 Burkhan Bakshin Altan Sume
 Geden Sheddup Choikorling Monastery
 Clear Script

References

Further reading
Seth Mydans, An Ex-Telemarketer's Other Life as a Buddhist Saint, The New York Times, 12 June 2004
Sinclair, Tara (2008). Tibetan Reform and the Kalmyk Revival of Buddhism, Inner Asia 10(2), 241-259
 Ulanov, Mergen; Badmaev, Valeriy and Holland, Edward (2017). Buddhism and Kalmyk Secular Law in the Seventeenth to Nineteenth Centuries, Inner Asia 19(2), 297–314

External links
Buddhism in Kalmykia
Republic of Kalmykia: News and events

 
Kalmykia
Kalmykia